Peter Blount (died c. 1405), from Dorchester, Dorset, was an English politician.

Family
His first wife was named Juliana; his second wife was Isabel. He was the older brother of John Blount, who was also an MP.

Career
He was a Member (MP) of the Parliament of England for Dorchester in February 1383, October 1383, April 1384, 1385 and 1386.

References

14th-century births
1405 deaths
English MPs February 1383
English MPs October 1383
English MPs April 1384
English MPs 1385
English MPs 1386
Members of the Parliament of England for Dorchester